Mercer Street Historic District is a national historic district  located at Princeton, Mercer County, West Virginia.  The district includes 28 contributing buildings in the central business district of Princeton. The buildings are primarily two and three-story, masonry commercial buildings with storefronts on the first floor and housing in the upper stories. Almost all of the buildings date from the opening of the Virginian Railway in 1908 and 1909.  Notable buildings include the Old Stag Clothing Store, Mercer County Schools Warehouse (c. 1930), Cleaners and Laundry Building (c. 1915), Sively Company Building (1913), Mullins Brothers Building (1912), and D&D Saddle and Tack Building (c. 1915).

It was listed on the National Register of Historic Places in 2003.

References

Commercial buildings on the National Register of Historic Places in West Virginia
Historic districts in Mercer County, West Virginia
National Register of Historic Places in Mercer County, West Virginia
Historic districts on the National Register of Historic Places in West Virginia
Princeton, West Virginia